Playtyme Is Over is the second album by American band Immature, released on August 2, 1994; their first release with MCA. It peaked at number 88 on The Billboard 200 chart and at number 26 on the Top R&B/Hip-Hop Albums chart. The first single released from the album was "Never Lie" which peaked at number 5 on the Billboard Hot 100 chart, and the second single was "Constantly," which peaked at number 16 on the same chart. The third and final single released was "I Don't Mind", which peaked at number 92 on the Hot 100. It is also the first album to feature drummer Kelton "LDB" Kessee.

Track listing

"I Don't Mind" (Colin England, Roy "Dog" Pennon) (4:26)
"Never Lie" (Claudio Cueni, Chris Stokes) (4:13)
"Walk You Home" (Roy "Dog" Pennon, Chris Stokes (3:19)
"Constantly" (Teron Beal, Delroy Pearson, Jesse Powell, Ian Prince) (5:43)
"Broken Heart" (Claudio Cueni, Chris Stokes, Dean Wakatsuki) (4:16)
"Summertime" (Chris Stokes) (3:30)
"Nothing But a Party" (Kyle Hudnall, Chris Stokes) (3:32)
"Look Into Your Eyes" (Chris Stokes) (3:57)
"Sweetest Love" (Lathun Grady, Charles Norris) (3:40)
"Just a Little Bit" (Delroy Pearson, Jesse Powell, Ian Prince) (4:42)
"I Don't Mind" (The Vibe Mix) (Colin England, Roy "Dog" Pennon) (4:36)

Singles track listing
Constantly / Never Lie (The Remixes)
US Vinyl, 12"
A1 Constantly [Funky Street Mix] 3:58
A2 Constantly [Funky Street Mix Instrumental] 3:59
B Never Lie [Da' Bomb Street Remix]4:27

Additional personnel
Taz (vocals)
Slice Money (various instruments)
Lathun Grady (background vocals)

Charts

Weekly charts

Year-end charts

Certifications

References

1994 albums
IMx albums
MCA Records albums
Hip hop soul albums